All Hallows or Allhallows or variation, may refer to:

 All Saints' Day, a Christian feast day

Places
 Allhallows, Cumbria, England, UK
 Allhallows, Kent, and Allhallows-on-Sea, England, UK

Churches and religious orders

In England

In London
 All Hallows, Bow
 All Hallows-by-the-Tower
 All Hallows Honey Lane (destroyed 1666)
 All Hallows-on-the-Wall
 All Hallows, Bread Street (demolished 1878)
 All Hallows Lombard Street (demolished 1937)
 All Hallows Staining (demolished 1873, but tower survives)
 All-Hallows-the-Less (destroyed 1666)
 All-Hallows-the-Great (demolished 1894)
 All Hallows' Church, Tottenham
 All Hallows, Twickenham

Elsewhere in England
 All Hallows Road, Easton, Bristol
 Bispham Parish Church, known as All Hallows, Lancashire
 All Hallows Church, Great Mitton, Lancashire
 All Hallows Church, Clixby, Lincolnshire (redundant)
 Church of All Hallows, Allerton, Liverpool
 All Hallows' Church, Ordsall, Nottinghamshire
 All Hallows' Church, Harthill, South Yorkshire
 Community of All Hallows, Ditchingham, Suffolk
 All Hallows Church, Bardsey, West Yorkshire

In other places
 Priory of All Hallows, Dublin, Ireland, dissolved in the Reformation
 All Hallows Episcopal Church, Snow Hill, Worcester County, Maryland, U.S.
 All Hallows Church (South River, Maryland), U.S.

Education
 All Hallows School (disambiguation)
 All Hallows College, Dublin, Ireland
 All Hallows Catholic College, Macclesfield, Cheshire, England
 All Hallows Catholic School, Surrey, England

Other uses
 All Hallow's E.P., a 1999 album by the band AFI
 All Hallows, the journal of the Ghost Story Society

See also

 All Hallows' Eve, also known as Halloween or Hallowe'en
 All Hallows' Eve (disambiguation)
 All Saints Church (disambiguation)
 Hallow (disambiguation)